David Adams and John-Laffnie de Jager were the defending champions, and won in the final 5–7, 6–2, 6–3, against Tim Henman and Yevgeny Kafelnikov.

Seeds

  Wayne Arthurs /  Sandon Stolle (semifinals)
  David Adams /  John-Laffnie de Jager (champions)
  Olivier Delaître /  Jeff Tarango (quarterfinals)
  Jonas Björkman /  Daniel Vacek (first round)

Draw

Draw

External links
Draw
Qualifying Draw

Doubles
2000 ATP Tour